The Cooperstown Historic District is a national historic district in Cooperstown, Otsego County, New York, that was listed on the National Register of Historic Places in 1980.  It encompasses 232 contributing properties: 226 contributing buildings, 1 contributing site, 3 contributing structures, and 2 contributing objects.  Among the contributing properties is the village's post office, which is individually listed on the National Register.

In 1997, the boundaries of the historic district were increased to include the Fenimore Farm Stone Agricultural Buildings that were built in 1918 and designed by Frank P. Whiting.

Contributing buildings 

 Byberry Cottage
 Doubleday Field
 Edgewater
 Elleryt Cory House
 Iron Clad Building
 Lakelands
 Otsego County Bank
 Pomeroy Place
 The Inn at Cooperstown
 The Otesaga Hotel
 United States Post Office
 Woodside Hall

See also
National Register of Historic Places listings in Otsego County, New York

References

External links

The following are located in Otsego Township, Cooperstown, Otsego County, NY:

The following are located in Middlefield Township, Cooperstown, Otsego County, NY:

Historic districts on the National Register of Historic Places in New York (state)
Italianate architecture in New York (state)
Historic American Buildings Survey in New York (state)
Historic districts in Otsego County, New York
National Register of Historic Places in Otsego County, New York
1980 establishments in New York (state)